Leon ter Wielen (born 31 August 1988 in Raalte) is a Dutch professional footballer who plays as a goalkeeper for SV Spakenburg in the Dutch Tweede Divisie. He formerly played for BV Veendam and PEC Zwolle.

Honours

Club
PEC Zwolle
KNVB Cup (1): 2013–14
Eerste Divisie (1): 2011–12

References

1988 births
Living people
Dutch footballers
SC Veendam players
PEC Zwolle players
Achilles '29 players
Fortuna Sittard players
SV Spakenburg players
Eredivisie players
Eerste Divisie players
Tweede Divisie players
Derde Divisie players
Sportspeople from Zwolle
Association football goalkeepers
Rohda Raalte players
Footballers from Overijssel